89 Leonis is a single star in the equatorial constellation of Leo, the lion. It has a yellow-white hue and is faintly visible to the naked eye with an apparent visual magnitude of 5.70. Based upon parallax measurements, it is located at a distance of 88 light years from the Sun. The star has a high proper motion and is moving further away with a radial velocity of +4.8 km/s. It is a candidate member of the TW Hydrae stellar kinematic group.

This is an F-type main-sequence star with a stellar classification of F5.5V. It is an estimated 1.13 billion years old and is spinning with a rotation period of 7.73 days. It shows evidence of a short-term activity cycle lasting  days. The star has 1.3 times the mass of the Sun and 1.4 times the Sun's radius. It is radiating three times the luminosity of the Sun from its photosphere at an effective temperature of 6,461 K.

References

F-type main-sequence stars
High-proper-motion stars
TW Hydrae association
Leo (constellation)
Durchmusterung objects
Leonis, 89
100563
056445
4455